"" (English: "The Torture") is a song by Colombian singer-songwriter Shakira, featuring Spanish singer Alejandro Sanz, from Shakira's sixth studio album Fijación Oral, Vol. 1 (2005). It was released on 13 April 2005 by Epic Records as the lead single from the album. The song was written and produced by Shakira, with additional musical composition and production from longtime collaborators Luis Fernando Ochoa and Lester Mendez respectively. "La Tortura" is a song with prominent influences of reggaeton, and lyrically tells the story of a woman who has been emotionally "tortured" because her boyfriend cheated and eventually left her for another, and has now returned begging forgiveness.

After its release, the song received generally positive reviews by music critics, who agreed that the song was a prominent part of Fijación Oral, Vol. 1. "La Tortura" was also well received commercially, leading the lists of the US Hot Latin Songs, Latin Pop Songs and Tropical Songs, in the United States. In the rest of the world, the song topped the charts in Venezuela, Spain and Hungary where it was the most played song of the year, spending a total of 8 consecutive weeks at the top of the charts. An accompanying music video was released for the promotion of the single, and was directed by Michael Haussman.

The song received multiple awards and nominations, including two awards at the Latin Grammy Awards at the 2006 Ceremony for Song of the Year and Record of the Year. "La Tortura" is one of the best selling singles of all time, with more than 5 million copies sold worldwide, being certified gold in the United States by the Recording Industry Association of America (RIAA) for 500,000 digital copies sold, and the certification has been updated to 32 times platinum (1,920,000 units sold). It was also recognized as the best-selling Spanish song worldwide at all the times, with almost three million digital sales and ringtones combined sold in the United States alone to date. To promote "La Tortura", Shakira made a number of live performances in several television and award shows.

Background and composition

The single is a duet between Shakira and Spanish singer Alejandro Sanz, both of whom also composed it alongside Luis Fernando Ochoa. It was mixed by Gustavo Celis.

"La Tortura" is a reggaeton-inspired track which lyrically tells the story of a woman who has been emotionally "tortured" because her boyfriend cheated and eventually left her for another, and has now returned begging forgiveness. He apologises extravagantly, but is ultimately of the thinking that infidelity is natural for men and for the woman not to forgive him would be tiresome and unreasonable. However, at the end of the song, Shakira's character humiliates him and says that she is not going to cry over him.

Remixes
The single and the album also included a remix of the song by Gustavo Celis entitled "The Shaketon Mix", merging a reggaeton rhythm. A separate music video (also directed by Michael Haussman) was also made for this remix. This video also entered on TRL's countdown.

There is another official reggaeton remix called "Eddie Arroyo Reggaeton Remix". Another official mix has surfaced, the "Tracy Young Special According Mix" and other remixes have also been made by independent DJs. An alternative version of this song, is featured as a bonus track in the re-release of Oral Fixation Vol. 2, with the chorus sung partially in the English-language.

Critical reception
The song received positive reviews from most music critics. Matt Cibula from PopMatters wrote an extense review, saying that "The big single isn't quite reggaetón, although it makes full use of the reggaetón beat. What really matters are these two overheated voices working with and against each other, and the way that undeniable beat really comes alive when there is actually a beautiful melody underneath it." Spencer D. from IGN wrote that "the more 'ethnic' musical implements on "La Tortura" (accordion, Spanish guitar flutters, jostling rhythms, and the complementary male vocals of Alejandro Sanz) make for one of the more enjoyable and distinct inclusions on the album; a slice of Shakira being Shakira and eschewing the affectation of anybody else's vocal stylings."

Commercial performance
Since its release as a single, the song has become one of the most important Latin songs to move into the mainstream English-speaking culture in the US and Canada. "" reached a position of number 23 on the Billboard Hot 100 in less than twenty weeks after its release and was ranked number 60 in the Year-End Chart. The song was certified Gold by Recording Industry Association of America (RIAA) for over 500,000 digital sales. The song also held the record for the longest-run on the Billboard's Hot Latin Tracks chart a total of 25 non-consecutive weeks until it was broken by Enrique Iglesias's song "Bailando" in 2014. At Billboard magazine's year-end chart (that shows the hottest songs of the year); "" was the number-one song on the Hot Latin Tracks chart and ranked third at the Hot Latin Songs 25th Anniversary chart.

In 2020, Billboard revealed that "La Tortura" was the 5th most successful Latin song of all time on the Hot Latin Songs chart.

The track was also successful in Europe, reaching the top ten in almost all countries it charted. It debuted at number one on the Spanish Singles Chart, while in Switzerland, the song was in the top five for fifteen consecutive weeks, although it never reached the top position. In Hungary, the song spent eight consecutive weeks at number-one position. "La Tortura" was not released as an official single in the United Kingdom until December 2006, bundled with the release of "Illegal" and charted at 34 on the UK Singles Chart. As a result, it was featured in the 2007 edition of Guinness World Records. "La Tortura" was chosen as the fifth favorite song of the world in a global survey made by Sony Ericsson, in which 700,000 music fans of 66 countries contributed.

Legacy
"La Tortura" was "the first Spanish-language video to air on MTV without an English-language version". "La Tortura" was the first Spanish song to be added to high rotation on VH1.
Shakira and Sanz performed the song at the MTV Video Music Awards in 2005, and Daddy Yankee performed "Gasolina", making this the first time any Spanish song was performed at the awards ceremony.

Further, the book titled "Reggaeton" published by Duke University Press credits the song and Shakira for popularizing the genre (reggaeton) in North America, Europe, and Asia.

Music video

The accompanying music video for "La Tortura" was directed by Michael Haussman. It has a simple plot: from his new girlfriend's apartment, Sanz spies on Shakira as she is walking down the street holding a bag of onions on her way to her own apartment, which is on the other side of the street from Sanz' girlfriend's apartment. When Shakira enters her apartment, she changes clothes. From that moment on, Sanz remembers things the two had done in the past as a couple, while Shakira reveals her alter-ego dancing erotically on the building's roof, covered with black paint. The choreography of the music video was made by Jamie King and Shakira herself.

The music video is notable for being the first Spanish-only video to be aired on MTV. The channel also showed a whole episode of their Making the Video series in Spanish, with English subtitles. The remix version of the song, known as "La Tortura (Shaketon Remix)", has its own video (also directed by Haussman) featuring some previously unseen scenes. This video can be seen on Oral Fixation Volumes 1 & 2 bonus DVD. The video was marked "Vevo Certified" by joint venture music video website Vevo for reaching more than 100 million views on YouTube. The music video of the song was nominated for Best Female Video, Best Dance Video and Viewer's Choice Award on the 2005 MTV Video Music Awards.

Accolades
2005 MTV Video Music Awards
Viewer's Choice (nominated)
Best Female Video (nominated)
Best Dance Video (nominated)

2006 Latin Grammy Awards
Latin Grammy Award for Song of the Year (won)
Latin Grammy Award for Record of the Year (won)

2005 MTV Video Music Awards Latinoamerica
Video of the Year (won)

2005 NRJ Awards
International Song Of The Year (won)

2005 Billboard Music Awards
Hot Latin Song Of The Year (won)

2005 Latin Billboard Music Awards
Song of the Year (won)
Song of the Year, Vocal Duet (won)
Ringtone of the Year (won)

Track listing
Maxi CD
 "La Tortura" [Album version] - 3:36
 "La Tortura" [Shaketon Reggaeton Remix] - 3:12
 "La Pared" [Acoustic Version] - 2:39

Credits and personnel
 Invited artist: Alejandro Sanz (appears courtesy of Warner Music Benelux, BV)
 Lyrics: Shakira
 Music: Shakira, Luis F. Ochoa
 Vocals: Shakira, Alejandro Sanz
 Vocal arrangements: Shakira, Alejandro Sanz

Production
 Producer: Shakira
 Executive producer: Rick Rubin
 Co-producer: Lester Mendez for Living Stereo
 Additional production: José "Gocho" Torres, Santana "The Golden Boy"
 Remixer: José "Gocho" Torres ("Shaketon Mix")

Engineering
 Recording engineers: Gustavo Celis, Rob Jacobs, Kevin Killen
 Assistant engineers: Bryan Gallant, Juan Camarano, Felipe Alvarez
 Programming: Pete Davis
 Mix engineer: Gustavo Celis

Musicians
 Electric guitar: Lyle Workman, Luis F. Ochoa
 Acoustic guitar: René Toledo, Alejandro Sanz
 Keyboards & Programming: Lester Mendez
 Bass: Paul Bushnell
 Percussion: Archie Peña
 Accordion: Umberto Judex, Frank Morocco

Charts

Weekly charts

Year-end charts

All-time charts

Certifications and sales

Release history

See also
 List of Romanian Top 100 number ones of the 2000s

References

2005 songs
2005 singles
Number-one singles in Romania
Number-one singles in Spain
Shakira songs
Alejandro Sanz songs
Spanish-language songs
Male–female vocal duets
Latin Grammy Award for Record of the Year
Latin Grammy Award for Song of the Year
Music videos directed by Michael Haussman
Record Report Top 100 number-one singles
Songs written by Shakira
Song recordings produced by Lester Mendez
Songs with feminist themes
Songs written by Luis Fernando Ochoa
Epic Records singles